William Nicholson (27 February 1816 – 10 March 1865) was an Australian colonial politician who became the third Premier of Victoria. He is remembered for having been called the "father of the ballot" due to his responsibility in introducing the secret ballot in Victoria.

Early life
Nicholson was born in Whitehaven, Cumberland, the son of an Anglican farmer. At the age of twenty six, in 1842, he emigrated to Australia, setting up business as a grocer in Melbourne. He was a successful businessman and became the head of a merchant firm, W. Nicholson and Company. In 1848 Nicholson was elected to the Melbourne City Council, and served as Mayor of Melbourne (1850–51). He was also a director of the Bank of Victoria and several other companies.

Political career
In 1852, Nicholson won another election, to the Legislative Council for North Bourke. In 1853, he became a member of the committee which drafted the Constitution of Victoria, and on 18 December 1855, Nicholson moved a successful motion which stated that any Victorian electoral act should include voting by secret ballot. That was opposed by the government of Premier William Haines and, after the motion was passed, Haines resigned.

Although it was actually Henry Chapman who devised the secret ballot motion, the fact that Nicholson moved it gained him the credit and, when Haines resigned, Nicholson was invited by the Governor of Victoria Sir Charles Hotham to form a government. However, he was unable to do so and Haines became Premier again.

In 1856, Nicholson visited England, where he was congratulated for his work in establishing the secret ballot, which had been advocated by the Chartist movement there. The system was introduced in Victoria on 19 March 1856, and in South Australia on 2 April in the same year. It was later adopted by all the other colonies. The secret ballot was known as "the Victorian ballot" for the rest of the 19th century.

Nicholson returned to Melbourne in 1858, and in 1859 was elected to the Legislative Assembly for the seat of Murray. Later that year, he shifted to Sandridge (now Port Melbourne), which he represented until 1864. When the conservative government of Premier John O'Shanassy was defeated in October 1859, Nicholson became Premier and Chief Secretary.

Much of Nicholson's premiership was spent trying to pass a bill which allowed small farmers to settle on grazing lands appropriated by the squatters, but it encountered strong opposition from the Legislative Council, which was dominated by landowners. When the Council severely amended the bill there were riots outside Parliament House. That stiffened conservative resistance and the bill was eventually passed in a much weaker form, which the squatters easily evaded. That failure led to Nicholson's resignation in November 1860.

Late life
Nicholson did not hold office again. Parallel to his serving as the premier of Victoria, however, he also fulfilled the duties of Chairman of the Melbourne Chamber of Commerce. In 1860 he also held his third office, that of the Secretary of the Royal Society of Victoria.

In January 1864, William Nicholson became severely ill and, unable to fully recover, died in little more than a year, less than two weeks after his forty-ninth birthday. He was survived by his wife Sarah Burkitt, née Fairclough, and four sons. Nicholson Street, a major north–south traffic artery in modern Melbourne, is named after him.

References

1816 births
1865 deaths
Premiers of Victoria
Mayors and Lord Mayors of Melbourne
People from Whitehaven
Victoria (Australia) state politicians
Members of the Victorian Legislative Council
Members of the Victorian Legislative Assembly
19th-century Australian politicians
English emigrants to colonial Australia
Australian grocers
19th-century Australian businesspeople
Businesspeople from Melbourne